You Cannot Be Serious ( in the U.S., Serious  in the UK) is a book written by the world's former #1 tennis player John McEnroe (with James Kaplan).

McEnroe details life behind the scenes on the tennis tour and provides the reader with a very candid look at his personal life and struggles. The book made it to the top of the New York Times bestseller list. 
The hardcover edition was published by G.P. Putnam's Sons in 2002, with the paperback being released a year later by The Berkley Publishing Group in the U.S., and by Time Warner in the UK.  The name of the book comes from McEnroe's famous outburst "You cannot be serious!" from his match against Tom Gullikson at the 1981 Wimbledon Championships.

Notes

2002 non-fiction books
Tennis books
G. P. Putnam's Sons books